HDMS Allart, a brig launched at Copenhagen in June 1807, was amongst the ships taken by the British after the second Battle of Copenhagen.  In British service, she was recaptured by Danish-Norwegian gunboats after venturing too close inshore. Her subsequent service was in the Dano-Norwegian Navy's Norwegian Brig Division, which harried enemy frigates and convoys in Norwegian waters. On the separation of Denmark from Norway in 1814, Allart transferred to the Norwegian navy, who sold her in 1825.

Origin and capture
Allart was one of a second series of four brigs that the Dano-Norwegian navy built to a design by Ernst Wilhelm Stibolt, and highly similar to that of the four brigs of the Lougen class. The British seized three of each class after the surrender of the Dano-Norwegian fleet. The British took Allart into service as Allart, (or Alaart).

British service
Allart arrived at Chatham on 15 December 1807. She then spent the next six months until 16 May 1808 being fitted. Commander James Tillard commissioned her in February.
On 27 July 1808 Alaart recaptured the sloop Goede Hoepe.

In 1808 Alaart was with Admiral Saumarez's fleet, which was blockading Rager Vik (Ragerswik or Rogerswick or Russian: Baltiyskiy) where the Russian fleet was sheltering after the British 74-gun third rates  and  had destroyed the Russian 74-gun Vsevolod. Still, on 13 September the British made a half-hearted attempt, with Erebus leading, and Salsette, Allart, and the hired armed cutter Swan providing cover. The attack failed, with the loss of one vessel, a Russian brig that the British had taken earlier. Saumarez then abandoned the plan.

On 9 April 1809 Alaart captured the Danish galiot Flyndern while  was in sight. Nine days later Minx captured the Danish galiot Anna Johanna Christina while Alaart was in sight.

At some point Alaart sent in her boats at Bornholm where they succeeded in destroying a large vessel under the guns of a Danish battery.

On 30 April Alaart was among the vessels in company or in sight when  captured the Charlotte. In July 1809 Louis A Robinson, Master’s Mate of Alaart, was in a prize that she had taken when two armed Danish boats attacked simultaneously. Robinson succeeded in capturing one and repelling the other. Then on 9 August he was in charge of another prize when a Danish privateer lugger made three unsuccessful attempts to board his vessel.

Recapture
On 10 August 1809, Allart, still under Commander James Tillard, chased the Dano-Norwegian warships Lougen and  into Fredriksvern, only to find herself the quarry of 15 Danish gunboats, arrayed in three divisions. After a three-hour chase the gunboats closed with Allart and an engagement began. After an engagement that lasted two hours, Alaart struck, having had her rigging shot away and having lost one man killed and three wounded. The officer in command of the gunboat flotilla was Captain Søren Adolph Bille.

Dano-Norwegian service

On 1 May 1810, off southernmost Norway, the 36-gun fifth-rate frigate,  attempted an attack on Samsøe and Alsen, which retreated towards land and the protection of the Mandal division of gunboats and the other brigs Allart and Seagull. Once reunited as a brig squadron, the four Danish-Norwegian brigs sought to bring Tribune to action in a lively sea but the frigate maintained sufficient searoom.  Action was eventually broken off with some damage to Tribunes sails and her boats.

On 12 May there was another inconclusive meeting, in the North Sea, of the four brigs with a British frigate, which retired with discretion after some sail and rigging damage in an 80-minute exchange of cannon fire.  Allart was commanded by Premierløitnant G. Hagerup on this occasion.

On 18 July 1812, Henry Weir of  reported that he had encountered the cutter , which had gone into Norwegian waters to reconnoiter after the Battle of Lyngør. Nimble had reported that seeing four brigs at Christiansand: Allart, Seagull, Langeland, and Alsen.

Fate
Allart was in Norwegian waters in January 1814 when the Treaty of Kiel settled separation of Norway from Denmark, but it was not until 1816 that negotiations agreed that Allart was not Danish. She was written off the Danish books on 12 November 1816. The Norwegian navy sold her in 1825 into merchant service.

See also
List of ships captured at Battle of Copenhagen

Notes

Citations

References
 
Fra Krigens Tid (1807 -1814) (From the wartime) edited by N A Larson, Christiana (Oslo) 1878
 
Voelcker, Tim (2008) Admiral Saumarez Versus Napoleon: The Baltic, 1807-12. (Boydell & Brewer Ltd.).
 
Individual record cards in Danish for ships of the Danish Royal Navy are sometimes available from the internet site Orlogmuseet Skibregister, but not Allart (as at November 2019).
The Danish Naval Museum is building a new website at which details, drawings and models may be available. For individual ships already listed, including Allart, see here 

1807 ships
Brigs of the Royal Dano-Norwegian Navy
Captured ships
Brigs of the Royal Navy
1814 in Norway
Ships designed by Ernst Wilhelm Stibolt
Ships built in Copenhagen
Ships of the Royal Norwegian Navy